Still Here is a 2020 American crime drama film co-written and directed by Vlad Feier. It stars Johnny Whitworth, Maurice McRae, Afton Williamson, Jeremy Holm, Zazie Beetz, and Larry Pine. The film is based on true events.

The film was released in the United States on August 28, 2020, by Blue Fox Entertainment.

Premise
Set in today's New York, the film follows the heartbreaking story of a missing 12-year-old girl and the pain of her family.

Cast
 Johnny Whitworth as Christian Baker
 Afton Williamson as Tiffany Watson
 Maurice McRae as Michael Watson
 Zazie Beetz  as Keysha
 Larry Pine as Jeffrey Hoffman
 Jeremy Holm as Greg Spaulding
 Gia Crovatin as Paige Sullivan
 Danny Johnson as Anthony Evans
 Rupert Simonian as Sam Perkin

Production
Filming took place in New York City, Brooklyn and Long Island. Johnny Whitworth plays the young journalist Christian Baker. Afton Williamson, Zazie Beetz and Larry Pine set to appear in Still Here.

Release
Blue Fox Entertainment acquired the worldwide rights for the film at the European Film Market during the 70th edition of Berlin International Film Festival. It is scheduled to have a limited release on August 28, 2020, then on video on demand on September 4, 2020.

Critical reception

References

External links
 

African-American drama films
American coming-of-age drama films
American crime drama films
American independent films
Drama films based on actual events
Films about missing people
Films about human trafficking in the United States
Films about poverty in the United States
Films set in 2013
Films set in Brooklyn
Films set in Long Island
Films set in New York City
Films shot in New York City
2020 films
2020 crime drama films
2020s English-language films
2020s American films